Mohammad Rakibul Hasan (born September 29, 1977), also known as M R Hasan and MRH, is a Bangladeshi documentary photographer, photojournalist, filmmaker and visual artist. He has made black and white photographs about climate change, political violence and the Rohingya refugee crisis. He has also been practicing fine art photography and digital art since many years.

Hasan was awarded the One World Media Awards 2022, and Lucie Awards Discovery of the Year 2018. He also received the 23rd Human Rights Press Awards for his series "The Looted Honor" on rape survivors of Rohingya Refugee from The Foreign Correspondents’ Club Hong Kong, Amnesty International and the Hong Kong Journalists Association that recognizes top reporting on Asian news.

Early life and education
Hasan was born in a small town in Sherpur, Bangladesh; he was the youngest of five children. Hasan was brought up in a middle-class Muslim family. He had a rich library in his home where he spent a long time reading literature and looking at art. He was passionate about painting from early childhood and practiced writing Bengali poetry. 

Hasan was introduced to photography while studying Film & Video Production at UBS Film School (Sydney Film School) at the University of Sydney. His interest in photography led him to become a professional photographer when he returned to Bangladesh. Hasan was granted a full scholarship from the World Press Photo (WPP) in the Netherlands to study for a Postgraduate Diploma in Photojournalism at Ateneo de Manila University, Philippines. He studied for a Certificate of Higher Education in History of Art at the University of Oxford and studied for a One-Year Certificate in Creative Practices receiving a Director’s Fellowship at the International Center of Photography (ICP). He also earned a BA (Hons) in Photography from Falmouth University.

Journal

Mohammad Rakibul Hasan (2018). Wave (Photo-essay). Asia Pacific Perspective: A publication of the Center for Asia Pacific Studies, University of San Francisco.

Article & Interview
An Interview of Mohammad Rakibul Hasan about COVID-19, Daily Asianage 
PX3 Prix de la Photographie Paris 2020 – Non-Professional, First Place Winner in Press – The Last Savings 
WINNER, IPA DISCOVERY OF THE YEAR, 2018
ZEKE magazine, Guest Editor

Work
Hasan contributes to The Daily Star, and Melbourne-based Falcon Photo Agency represented him, and later he joined New York City-based Redux Pictures. 

The Asian Development Bank has commissioned Hasan, FAO of the United Nations, International Committee for the Red Cross, Helen Keller Foundation, Save the Children, and Save an Orphan.

His work has been published in newspapers, magazines, online media, and books such as Asian Geographic Magazine, the BBC, The Ecologist, The Sunday Times, The Invisible Photographer Asia, Lenscratch, CFYE Magazine, and Fluster Magazine.

Hasan's photo stories include Park Life, Salt, Wave, and I am Rohingya.

He is the admin of Bangladeshi Photographers (BP) photography community, which he created in 2005.

Exhibition 
   Nutrition Stories - Collaborative Responsibility for Change 
 	Photo Basal Festival 2020, Switzerland – “The Last Savings” – A photo series presented by Clair Gallery  
 	Belgrade Photo Month Festival 2018, Serbia – a solo exhibition of “I am Rohingya” Photo Essay 
 	Transcendence through images – a solo digital and appropriation art exhibition at Hotel La Meridian Dhaka, Bangladesh, 2018 
 	Solo Exhibition selection for the “I am Rohingya” series at Belgrade Photo Month 2018, Serbia 
 	10th Aniversary of Social Documentary Photography (SDN), at Bronx Documentary Center, USA 2018 
 	10th Aniversary of Social Documentary Photography (SDN), at Bronx Documentary Center, USA 2018 
 	ArtèFoto Exhibition 2011, Italy 
 	http://www.youtube.com/watch?v=2lhwMR0DEW4
 	Ian Parry Scholarship Exhibition 2011, Getty Image Gallery, London, England 
 	People & Planet International Photo Exhibition 2010, Fitzroy, Melbourne, Australia 
 	Environmental Photographer of the Year 2010 Exhibition, Air Gallery, Mayfair, England
 	Food Security Photo Exhibition 2010, Alliance Francaise Gallery, Dhaka, Bangladesh 
 	“The Marginal Lives” duet Photo Exhibition 2009, Impressions Gallery, Gulshan, Dhaka, Bangladesh
 	Microfinance Photo Exhibition at Credit Agri Cole, Paris, France 2008 (Inaugurated by Noble Laureate Dr. Muhammad Yunus)

Awards
 2016: Grand Prize Winner, L.B. Brown Memorial Prize 2015, APAN, Japan
 2017: 2nd Prize in Fine Art and 2 Honorable Mentions in Documentary Series Categories, The 4th Global Student Photography Contest 2017, China
 2017: Award of Excellence, United Nations Information Center (UNIC) and Sophia University, Japan 2017
 2017: 2nd Runner-up, International Photo Competition on Sustainable Lifestyle 2017, CIDSE Together for Global Justice, 
 2017: Bronze Prize under Single Image Daily life Category, Life Press Photo Award 2017, Ukraine 
 2017: Honorable Mention – Categories: 2 Digitally Enhanced, 1 Editorial Politics, 1 Editorial Environment - International Photo Awards (IPA) 2017, USA
 2017: Finalist – Everyday Heroine, Youmanity Photography Award 2017, UK
 2018: Lucie Awards Discovery of the Year

 	Grant Recipient from The Global Research Programme on Inequality (GRIP) on the Imaging Inequality Photography Project partnership with the Bergen University, 2022, Norway 
 	Shortlisted on Story “Salt” at World Water day Photo Contest – 5th Edition 2022, Italy 
 	Top ten at the Photo Contest 2022 on Ecosystem restoration in the Hindu Kush Himalaya, organized by ICIMOD, Nepal 
 	Shortlist on Student Category (Photography Project) at the One World Media Award 2021, UK

Semi-finalist for “Salt” at GNG Green Earth Film Festival 2018, USA 
	Short Listed – CIWEM Environmental Video Contest 2011, England 
	Finalist – “Climate Genocide” – Water Climate Action Video Contest 2010, UN-Water & Water Channel, Mexico 
	3rd Prize – “The Hunter” – GEF Biodiversity Video Contest 2010, Global Environmental Facility (GEF), USA 
	2nd Runner Up – “The Effects of Climate Change” – My View on Asia Pacific Climate Change Short Film Contest 2010, Asian Development Bank (ADB), Philippines 
	Finalist – “The Effects of Climate Change” – Exchanges Connect International Video Contest 2010 - the Bureau of Educational & Cultural Affairs, U.S. Department of State, USA
	Finalist – “Water World” – Water for life Video Contest 2010 – Water Aid Bangladesh & Desh T.V., Bangladesh

 	The Best Talent Award 2020 for the series of “The Last Savings” at the Prix de la Photographie, Paris (PX3)
 	Exhibition selection of “The Looted Honor” photo series on Rohingya Rape Survivors from July to October 2021 at NordArt 2021 International Art Exhibition, Germany
 	Shortlist for the series “The Last Savings” at 2020 CHROMALUXE X Lucie Foundation’s FINE ART SCHOLARSHIP, USA 
 	One of the Winners among three from Thomson Reuters Foundation (TRF) and Omidyar Network’s ‘COVID-19: The Bigger Picture’ photo competition 2020, U.K. 
 	Student Winner of Bar-Tur Photo Award 2020 for the series “Salt” under the contest theme of “Climate Change.” 
 	Print Exhibition selection of the photo series “The Last Savings” at The 15th China Yixian International Photo Festival, China 2020 
 	Exhibition selection (Print) for the series “The Last Savings” at Shanghai International Photography Festival 2020, China 
 	Gold Winner for the two photo series “I am Rohingya” and “The Last Savings” under the Professional Category of Editorial Photography at the 2020 Budapest International Foto Awards 2020
 	Special Mention for the series “The Last savings” among the other 12 winners at the Rotterdam Photo 2021, Netherlands’ “Photo Festival & Awards.” 
 	Honorable Mention (Photojournalism - Professional category) on 15th Annual at Black & White Spider Awards 2020 
 	Winner of COVID-19 Reflections – Bar-Tur Photo Award 2020 for the series “The Last Savings.” 
 	Honorable Mention at the International Photography Awards (IPA) One-Shot “Movement” Photo Contest 2020, USA
 	Winner for the project “I am Rohingya” at the 100 Best Art, Design & Photography Competition and Book Publication 2019 by Creative Quarterly, New York  
   	2nd Place in the Deeper Perspective category at International Photography Awards (IPA) 2020, USA
   	5th Place in the Humanitarian category for the long-term project “I am Rohingya” at Imagely Documentary Project Fund & Fellowship 2019 – 2020, USA 
   	Exhibition selection of the project “The Looted Honor” for the 22nd Edition of the International Art Exhibition “NordArt,” Germany 
   	Three Honorable Mentions in three different categories of Photo Story/Series Annual Photography Awards (APA) 2019
   	Finalist on the theme of “Dignity” at the Portraits Hellerau Photo Contest, Germany 2020 
   	Shortlisted for the in-depth researched photo story titled “I am Rohingya” at the 2nd International Polyphony Photo Festival 2019, India

Film Screening 
Salt (12 minutes multimedia film) screened at Voices from the Waters International Traveling Film Festival 2018, India 
I am Rohingya (4 minutes multimedia film) – Al-Nahj International Film Festival 2017, Iraq

Jury
Jury at the New York Photography Awards 2022, USA
Jury at the Bar-Tur Photo Awards 2022, USA
Jury at the Bar-Tur Photo Awards 2021, USA 
Jury at the 2013 CGAP Microfinance Photo Contest, World Bank, USA 
Jury at the International Mother Language Day (IMLD) Photo Contest 2012, Sweden
 Regularly act as a jury for the various photo contests organized in Bangladesh from 2007 to 2022.
Asian Press Photo 2023

References

1977 births
Living people
People from Dhaka
Documentary photographers
Bangladeshi photojournalists
Bangladeshi photographers